Typhoon Louise–Marge, known in the Philippines as Typhoon Ining–Liling, was a powerful tropical cyclone that impacted Palau and the Philippines in November 1964. It was one of the most destructive typhoons documented in the central Philippines. Tracking data from meteorological agencies disagree whether the storm was a single tropical cyclone or two distinct tropical cyclones that occurred in quick succession, named separately by the Joint Typhoon Warning Center (JTWC) as Louise and Marge (and by the Philippine Weather Bureau as Ining and Liling). Louise–Marge's peak intensity and first landfall on the Philippines were associated with the Louise portion of the storm's history, while the Marge portion was weaker and shorter lived.

The typhoon may have formed as early as November 14 in the vicinity of Yap State. It quickly strengthened and became a typhoon by November 16. Later that day, the storm passed south of Palau near Anguar. Intensification continued, and Louise–Marge's winds later reached Category 5 intensity on the Saffir–Simpson scale at 7.3°N, closer to the equator than any other storm of such strength in the Northern Hemisphere on record. The storm's one-minute sustained winds topped out at  before making landfall on Surigao del Sur on November 18. Agencies that consider Louise and Marge to be the same storm indicate that the typhoon weakened over the Philippines and tracked northwest before making a counterclockwise arc across Luzon and the eastern South China Sea. Agencies that consider them separate systems believe Louise dissipated after crossing the Philippines, with a separate Marge concurrently developing east of Luzon and taking the arced path. Dissipation of the storm, either as Louise–Marge or as Marge, occurred by November 26.

Widespread devastation occurred in Angaur and Peleliu, two southern islands in Palau. In Peleliu, 97 percent of structures were destroyed. There was one death and four injuries caused by the typhoon in Palau, with total property and crop damage amounting to US$50,000–US$100,000. Louise–Marge moved across 13 Philippine provinces, with the most severe damage occurring in Surigao del Norte where the damage amounted to around US$12.5 million. Enumerations of the death toll ranged between 576 and 631, with around 300,000 people left homeless. Property damage was high throughout the affected regions, with Surigao City suffering the brunt of the typhoon. Philippine President Diosdado Macapagal stated that he had never "seen a more comprehensive devastation of any one province" following an aerial survey of Surigao del Norte.

Meteorological history 

The classification of Typhoon Louise–Marge as a single tropical cyclone or two distinct tropical cyclones is disputed among the datasets of meteorological agencies. The International Best Track Archive for Climate Stewardship (IBTrACS), endorsed by the World Meteorological Organization "as an official archiving and distribution resource" for storm track data, unifies the two phases of the storm. The China Meteorological Administration (CMA) also lists the system as a singular entity. However, the Japan Meteorological Agency (JMA) and Joint Typhoon Warning Center (JTWC)—of which the former manages the Regional Specialized Meteorological Center for the western Pacific—analyze the system as two tropical cyclones that occurred in quick succession. The JTWC named these two systems separately as Louise followed by Marge. The Philippine Weather Bureau also distinctly named the storms Ining and Liling.

Louise–Marge originated from the interaction between a polar trough and a westward-moving tropical wave. A vortex spawned from this interaction by November 12, accompanied by low air pressures. The system was first detected using meteorological satellites, a venue for observation still in its infancy in the early 1960s. This suggested Louise–Marge had potentially reached typhoon intensity within a day of forming. Intensification continued, and Louise–Marge attained its peak intensity on November 18 with one-minute maximum sustained winds of  according to the JTWC. The JMA estimated a minimum air pressure of 915 hPa (mbar; 27.02 inHg). This ranked Louise–Marge as one of the strongest typhoons in 1964. The typhoon was also located unusually close to the equator: at one point the storm had an intensity equivalent to a Category 5 hurricane on the Saffir–Simpson scale while located at 7.3°N, placing it closer to the equator than any other Northern Hemisphere tropical cyclone of such intensity.

On November 19, Louise–Marge made landfall on the shores of Lanzua Bay in Surigao del Sur, Philippines. The typhoon then weakened as it crossed the Visayas and fell below typhoon intensity on November 20. The fate of the storm after this point is disputed. According to the JTWC, the once powerful typhoon, named solely Louise, crossed Panay and slowed until it was stationary near Masbate later on November 20, rapidly weakening into a tropical depression and later dissipating on November 21. As Louise dissipated, the JTWC tracked a newly developing tropical cyclone, named Marge, that moved into Luzon at Dingalan as a low-end tropical storm. The JMA assessed Louise to have weakened after its encounter with the Philippines with dissipation in the South China Sea on November 21. The agency also monitored Tropical Storm Marge separately with a track beginning north of Samar on November 20 and taking an arced and clockwise path through Luzon and southwards within the South China Sea until the Marge's dissipation on November 26. The CMA depicts Marge indistinguishably from Louise, with the storm taking a continuous path northwest through the Visayas and then curving west across Luzon before turning south in the South China Sea. Data from the agencies indicate this second phase of the storm's duration dissipated on or before November 26.

Impact and aftermath 

The islands of Palau—administered at the time as part of the Trust Territory of the Pacific Islands—were affected by Louise–Marge between about 12:00 p.m. PWT on November 16 to 3:00 p.m. PWT November 17 (03:00 UTC November 16–06:00 UTC November 17). Angaur was within the storm's eye for 45 minutes. Thousands of people were rendered homeless by the typhoon in the islands. Louise–Marge's strong winds and storm surge destroyed much of the crops and vegetation on Angaur and Peleliu. Ninety percent of homes and much of the municipal and Trust government structures on Angaur were destroyed; a LORAN station operated by the United States Coast Guard and a church were among the few structures left standing. The damage was more pervasive on Peleliu where 97 percent of structures were destroyed. Total destruction or severe damage befell 15 percent of government facilities and 30 percent of private residences in Koror. The loss of homes displaced 53 families in Angaur and 125 families in Peleliu. One fatality and four injuries were reported in total from Palau, with property and crop damage ranging from US$50,000–US$500,000. Guam initiated relief efforts shortly after the typhoon's passage of Palau, leading to a joint effort between the Guam government, Commander Naval Forces Marianas, the American Red Cross, and the United States Coast Guard to deliver emergency supplies to the affected areas, including building materials, clothing, and vaccines. President Lyndon B. Johnson authorized $250,000 in federal funding for emergency assistance to Angaur and Peleliu on December 10. A rehabilitation committee was later established to plan the reconstruction of Angaur and Peleliu.

In its summary of 1964 typhoons published in the annual Climatological Data report, the United States Weather Bureau wrote that Louise–Marge "was one of the most destructive storms to hit the central Philippines in years." The death toll reached at least 576 and was accompanied by numerous displaced, injured, or missing persons. Reuters reported that as many as 300,000 people were left homeless, while the Philippine government indicated that 286,870 people were left homeless and estimated that 157,000 families were affected by the storm. The Philippine Red Cross enumerated 631 fatalities, 69 injured, 157 missing, and 376,235 displaced persons. The typhoon wrought widespread damage, valued in the millions in Philippine pesos, to crops and public infrastructure. Communications were undermined in the typhoon. Louise-Marge traversed at least thirteen Philippine provinces. Winds as high as  battered the provinces of Agusan, Bohol, Leyte, Surigao del Norte, and Negros Island. Surigao del Norte was hardest hit among them; at least 100 people were killed and an estimated 100,000 people were displaced by the storm in the province. These casualty figures were reported by a local police commander and later the Philippine Constabulary. At least 312 deaths occurred in Surigao, Surigao del Norte, where damage was estimated by Governor Constantino Navarro at around US$12.5 million; a village in the city reported over 100 fatalities and the loss of all buildings. Bacolod on Negros Island reported ten deaths and additional injuries. A tornado razed a chapel, killing the chapel minister and his family. A village leader in Negros Island gave of the following description of the destruction to a Philippine news service, as reported by The Canadian Press:

Floods and landslides damaged several bridges and public buildings in Agusan Province. Twelve drownings were reported in Occidental Mindoro. Nine inter-island ships capsized during the storm. Five people were killed after their ship sank off of Surigao del Norte. Another ship bearing 55 passengers sank off Zamboanga; the drownings of 6 people were confirmed while another 32 were presumed as drowned. Forty-six people were rescued after a freighter and a salvage tug were forced into a reef by the typhoon's winds off Labuan in Malaysia.

A state of calamity was declared for Surigao del Norte, accompanied by bans of hoarding and price speculation in the disaster zones. Colonel Godofredo Mendoza directed the deployment of all available Philippine Constabulary personnel in the province to assist in disaster relief. A government team was also mobilized to Surigao by President Diosdado Macapagal, as well as members of the Cabinet of the Philippines to survey the damage. Macapagal took part in an aerial survey of the damage in Surigao del Norte on November 25. Following the survey, Macapgal held an emergency meeting with the Cabinet and directed the issuance of loans to storm victims and to provide military and financial assistance to rebuilding the province; Macapgal commented that he had never "seen a more comprehensive devastation of any one province." Supplies and personnel were shipped to the disaster zone from Manila and other cities in the Philippines. The relief efforts of the Philippine Red Cross and Philippine Constabulary were directed not only to the typhoon's aftermath but to concurrent floods and an outbreak of cholera throughout the northern and central Philippines. The U.S. granted US$25,000 in relief aid to the Philippines. In June 1966, the Congress of the Philippines authorized ₱3.4 million to be distributed annually through fiscal year 1969-70 for Surigao del Norte and its municipalities.

See also 

 Typhoon Kate (1970)
 Typhoon Opal (1964)
 Typhoon Ike
 Typhoon Mike
Typhoon Bopha - another typhoon that took a similar path and became the strongest typhoon to make landfall in the island of Mindanao.
Typhoon Rai - the strongest typhoon to strike the Caraga Region since Louise-Marge, doing so as a Category 4 super typhoon.

References 

1964 Pacific typhoon season
Typhoons in the Philippines
Typhoons in Palau
Typhoons